Julien Benneteau and Nenad Zimonjić were the defending champions, but decided not to participate together.  Benneteau played alongside Édouard Roger-Vasselin, but lost to Bob and Mike Bryan in the quarterfinals. Zimonjić teamed up with Daniel Nestor, but lost to the Bryan brothers in the semifinals. The Bryans became the new champions, defeating Ivan Dodig and Marcelo Melo 6–3, 3–6, [10–8] in the final.

Seeds

  Bob Bryan /  Mike Bryan (champions)
  Alexander Peya /  Bruno Soares (quarterfinals)
  Ivan Dodig /  Marcelo Melo (final)
  David Marrero /  Fernando Verdasco (withdrew)
  Daniel Nestor /  Nenad Zimonjić (semifinals)
  Michaël Llodra /  Nicolas Mahut (second round)
  Łukasz Kubot /  Robert Lindstedt (second round)
  Julien Benneteau /  Édouard Roger-Vasselin (quarterfinals)

Draw

Finals

Top half

Bottom half

References
 Main Draw

2014 Monte-Carlo Rolex Masters